John Pritzlaff may refer to: 

John C. Pritzlaff (1820–1900), Prussian-American businessman 
John C. Pritzlaff Jr. (1925–2005), American politician
John Pritzlaff Hardware Company, a Wisconsin company founded by John C. Pritzlaff in 1850